This is a list of Nigerian films released in 1993.

Films

See also 

 List of Nigerian films

References 

1993
Lists of 1993 films by country or language
Films
1990s in Nigerian cinema